TVF Burhan Felek Sport Hall is a volleyball arena located in Üsküdar district of Istanbul, Turkey and reopened on 19 November 2010. It is owned by the Municipality of Kadıköy District and operated by the Directorate of Youth and Sport of Istanbul Province.

The women's volleyball teams, Galatasaray HDI Sigorta, Fenerbahçe Opet; men's volleyball teams Galatasaray HDI Sigorta and Fenerbahçe HDI Sigorta play their league matches.

Burhan Felek Volleyball Stadium

Burhan Felek Volleyball Stadium hosted the following volleyball matches:

References

Sports venues in Istanbul
Volleyball venues in Turkey
Indoor arenas in Turkey
Fenerbahçe Volleyball
Galatasaray Volleyball
Galatasaray S.K. facilities
Üsküdar